Sir Sydney Caine, KCMG (27 June 1902 – 2 January 1991) was an educator and economist.

Early life 
On 27 June 1902, Caine was born. Caine's father was Harry Caine, a railway clerk. Caine's mother was Jane. Caine attended Harrow County School in London, England.

Education 
In 1922, Caine graduated with a first class degree, specialising in Economic History from London School of Economics.

Career
Caine started his career as an assistant inspector of taxes. In 1926, Caine joined the Colonial Office, where he served as secretary to the West Indian Sugar Commission and to the UK Sugar Industry Commission.

In 1937, Caine was appointed as the Financial Secretary of Hong Kong, until 1940. He proposed the imposition of new water charging system amid the construction of Shing Mun Reservoir and income tax.

Between 1952 and 1957 he was the vice-chancellor of the University of Malaya in Singapore.

Caine was appointed the director of the LSE between 1957 and 1967. He was an alumnus of the LSE, and, before his appointment as director of the school, he was a well-known economist who had acted as a consultant for the World Bank for a period of time and had worked as a diplomat, being appointed minister at the British Embassy in Washington, US.

Between 1963 and 1970 he was the chairman of the governing board of the UNESCO International Institute for Educational Planning.

Personal life 
In 1925, Caine married Muriel Ann Harris. Their son, Michael, was born in 1927. His wife died in 1962.
 
Caine married secondly, in 1965, Doris Winifred Folkard (died 1973). He married, thirdly, in 1975, Elizabeth Bowyer (died 1996).

On 2 January 1991, aged 88, Sir Sydney Caine died.

Legacy 
 Hong Kong One Dollar note with Caine's printed signature.

References

External links
Former Directors of the LSE

1902 births
1991 deaths
Academics of the London School of Economics
Academics of the University of London
Financial Secretaries of Hong Kong
Government officials of Hong Kong
Knights Commander of the Order of St Michael and St George
People educated at Harrow High School
Members of the Executive Council of Hong Kong
Members of the Legislative Council of Hong Kong
20th-century British economists
Alumni of the London School of Economics
Vice-chancellors of universities in Malaysia